Dibutyltin dilaurate (abbreviated DBTDL) is an organotin compound with the formula . It is a colorless viscous and oily liquid. It is used as a catalyst .

Description 
In terms of its structure, the molecule of dibutyltin dilaurate consists of two laurate groups and two butyl groups attached to a tin(IV) atom. The molecular geometry at tin is tetrahedral. Based on the crystal structure of the related bis(bromobenzoate), the oxygen atoms of the carbonyl groups are weakly bonded to tin atom.

Decomposition 
Upon heating to decomposition temperature (which is above 250 °C), dibutyltin dilaurate emits acrid smoke and fumes.

Uses
Dibutyltin dilaurate is used as a paint additive. Together with dibutyltin dioctanoate, dibutyltin dilaurate is used as a catalyst for polyurethane production from isocyanates and diols. It is also useful as a catalyst for transesterification and for the room temperature vulcanization of silicones. It is also used as a stabilizer in polyvinyl chloride, vinyl ester resins, lacquers, and elastomers. It is also added to animal feed to remove cecal worms, roundworms, and tapeworms in chickens and turkeys and to prevent or provide treatment against hexamitosis and coccidiosis.

Hazards and toxicity
Dibutyltin dilaurate can be absorbed through the skin. It irritates skin and eyes (causes redness of skin and eyes). It is a neurotoxin. It can cause injuries to the liver, kidneys, and gastrointestinal tract. The symptoms of poisoning with dibutyltin dilaurate include nausea, headache, muscular weakness and even paralysis. Dibutyltin dilaurate is combustible. Its vapor is denser than air (21.8 times denser than air), so it can spread on the floors, forming explosive mixtures with air. On fire, it emits irritating and toxic fumes and smoke which contain tin, tin oxides and carbon oxides. Dibutyltin dilaurate is very reactive with acids and oxidizers.

Related compounds
 Dibutyltin dioctanoate: CAS#4731-77-5
 Dibutyltin diacetate: CAS #1067-33-0

References

Laurate esters
Organotin compounds
Tin(IV) compounds